Prose Combat is the second studio album by French rapper MC Solaar, released in 1994 by Cohiba Records. Its success propelled him to international fame.

An outtake from the album sessions was "Comme dans un film" (falsely known as "John Woo"). This song was featured on the album La Haine – musique inspirees du film (La Haine – music inspired by the film).

Track listing

French and US editions
 "Aubade" (Jimmy Jay, MC Solaar) – 0:35
 "Obsolète" (Jay) – 3:02
 "Nouveau western" (Gainsbourg, MC Solaar) – 4:34; samples "Bonnie and Clyde" by Serge Gainsbourg
 "À la claire fontaine" (Jay, M'Barali) – 2:59
 "Superstarr" (MC Solaar) – 3:03
 "La concubine de l'hémoglobine" (Jay, M'Barali) – 4:49
 "Dévotion" (MC Solaar) – 4:26
 "Temps Mort" (Jay, MC Solaar) – 3:41
 "L'NMIACCd'HTCK72KPDP" (Les Sages Poètes De La Rue) – 5:04
 "Séquelles" (Barali, Jay) – 3:37
 "Dieu ait son âme" (Barali, Pigale Boom Bass) – 4:46
 "À dix de mes disciples" (MC Solaar) – 3:45
 "La fin justifie les moyens" (MC Solaar) – 4:57
 "Relations humaines" (Bambi, MC Solaar) – 3:28
 "Prose combat" (Jay, M'Barali) – 3:06

UK edition
The UK edition replaces "Obsolète", "L'NMIACCd'HTCK72KPDP", and "Dieu ait son âme" with "Le free style d'obsolète", "Solaar Power", and "I'm Doin' Fine", respectively. The sequence of the tracks was also altered.

 "Aubade" (Jimmy Jay, MC Solaar) – 0:35
 "Le free style d'obsolète" (Jimmy Jay, MC Solaar) – 6:00
 "À la claire fontaine" (Jay, M'Barali) – 2:59
 "Superstarr" (MC Solaar) – 3:03
 "Solaar Power" (JP "Bluey" Maunick, MC Solaar) – 4:51
 "Relations humaines" (Bambi, MC Solaar) – 3:28
 "Nouveau western" (Gainsbourg, MC Solaar) – 4:34
 "La concubine de l'hémoglobine" (Jay, M'Barali) – 4:49
 "Dévotion" (MC Solaar) – 4:26
 "Séquelles" (Barali, Jay) – 3:37
 "I'm Doin' Fine" (Storch, Thompson, Malik, Trotter, Hubbard) – 8:19
 "À dix de mes disciples" (MC Solaar) – 3:45
 "La fin justifie les moyens" (MC Solaar) – 4:57
 "Temps mort" (Jay, MC Solaar) – 3:41
 "Prose combat" (Jay, M'Barali) – 3:06

Personnel
 Boom Bass – scratching, sampling
 Jimmy Jay – scratching, production
 Kiwi – voices
 MC Solaar – vocals
 Sinclair – harmony vocals
 Laurent Vernerey – bass
 Derin Young – vocals, harmony vocals

Charts

Weekly charts

Year-end charts

Certifications

References

1994 albums
MC Solaar albums